Anari (ISO: Anāṛī  ), is a 1993 Indian Hindi-language romantic drama film, produced by D. Rama Naidu under the Suresh Productions banner and directed by K. Murali Mohana Rao. The film stars Venkatesh (in his Hindi film debut) alongside Karishma Kapoor. The film emerged as a commercial success, and one of the highest grossing films of the year. It is a remake of the 1991 Tamil film Chinna Thambi.

Plot 
The story begins with the birth of a baby girl, Raj Nandini Singh, in the world of feudal landlords (Zamindars), whose word is law for the villagers who work on their land. Nandini's three brothers throw a feast in honor of the girl. The young son of the local singer (who had died) is brought in to sing for the event. The three brothers raise Nandini like their own child as their parents had died. At the age of 5, an astrologer predicts that Nandini will bring much happiness to the family, but her marriage will be based on her choice and not the choice of her elder brothers. This angers the brothers and to prevent this from happening, she is raised within the confines of the house. She is home-schooled and when she does go out, all the men are warned to hide from Nandini and that seeing Nandini will be result in dire consequences.

Raj Nandini (Karisma Kapoor) reaches puberty. The few men allowed around her are the service staff and her bodyguards. Meanwhile, the boy who sang, Rama (Venkatesh Daggubati) grows up to be a naive and gullible simpleton with a heart of gold. He is raised by his widowed mother Savitri (Raakhee Gulzar). He doesn't go to school and spends his time singing and entertaining the people of the village.

One day the bodyguards get into a fight with Rama who beats them up. Impressed by Rama's naivete and fighting skills, Nandini's brothers hire Rama to be Nandini's bodyguard and butler. Nandini, meanwhile, starts to resent her lack of freedom. She tricks Rama into showing her the village without her brothers' knowledge. Rama complies with her wishes and shows her the village, which results in Nandini falling ill. Rama is blamed for Nandini getting sick and gets beaten up by the brothers. Nandini, who has just started to like Rama, feels guilty for being the reason for him getting thrashed. This incident brings them closer emotionally. Nandini realizes she is now in love with Rama.

One day, a factory worker is punished for leering at Nandini. He plots to kill Nandini at the inauguration of the new factory owned by her brothers. Rama overhears the plot, and in a desperate attempt to save Nandini, lunges on her and inadvertently touches her in public. Nandini doesn't mind and defends Rama by arguing that Rama wouldn't do something like that in public. But her brothers are enraged. They beat him to the point of almost killing him. Nandini stops them and gives him a chance to explain. When Rama explains the situation they hang their heads in shame. Rama quits his job on the spot, despite Nandini's silent apology. That night Nandini decides to meet Rama and apologize and perhaps convince him to come back to the job. Rama refuses to come back as he doesn't want to put up with the violent nature of her brothers. She thinks if Rama marries her, they won't be able to manhandle Rama. She convinces Rama to tie a wedding chain (Mangalsutra) around her neck which will protect him from her brothers. Rama, without realizing the sanctity of the act, does as told and doesn't realize he is now married to her.

Rama comes back to work and is given a higher level of respect by the brothers for saving Nandini's life. Nandini too, starts emulating her sisters-in-law in taking care of her husband. This makes Rama nervous, but he still remains clueless. The change in her behavior is noticed by her sister-in-law who urges the brothers to get Nandini married off before the situation gets any worse. Nandini realizing that they are trying to get her married off, tries to make Rama understand that they are already married. Rama refuses to understand and runs away to his mother, who upon realizing what has happened, pulls him out of denial. She sends him away in an attempt to protect him.

The brothers come to know what has happened and try to humiliate Rama's mother to get her to reveal where her son is hiding. She is saved in time by her son who almost kills the brothers. The wives of the brothers stop him from killing them and ask him to save Nandini, who has upon hearing the torturous acts of her brothers, resorted to self-destruction, with them embracing. Rama rushes back to save his wife in which he succeeds. The movie ends with Nandini's recovery.

Cast 
Venkatesh Daggubati as Rama
Karishma Kapoor as Raj Nandini Singh
Raakhee Gulzar as Savitri, Rama's mother.
Suresh Oberoi as Bade Bhai Raja Vikram Singh
Adi Irani as Manjale Bhai Raja Surendra Singh
Gulshan Grover as Chote Bhai Raja Vinay Singh
Beena as Manjula Singh, Bade Bhai's Wife.
Johnny Lever as Bablu
Laxmikant Berde as Raghu
Subbiraj as Raj Jyotish
Raju Shrestha as Mad Villager
Priya Arun as Bijli
Sudha Rani as Sudha, Manjale Bhai's wife.
Shubha Khote
Dinesh Hingoo

Soundtrack 

Music composed by Anand–Milind. Lyrics written by Sameer. Music released on TIPS Audio Company.

References

External links 
 

1990s Hindi-language films
1993 films
Films scored by Anand–Milind
Hindi remakes of Tamil films
Hindi-language romance films
Suresh Productions films